Baeja is a type of traditional Korean vest which is worn over the jeogori by both men and women. It is generally sleeveless; however some baeja may have short sleeves. It was worn during the Joseon period and continues to be worn in present days. During the Joseon period, some forms of baeja (such as the ones used in the jeokui) were also introduced from China's Ming dynasty as bestowed clothing to the royal family.

Construction and design 
Baeja came be square collared or round collared and has a frontal closure, called habim, instead of having a overlapping closure. It also has a detachable collar band called dongjeong. It is closed with a round or knotted button at the bottom of the collar band. The front and back shoulders are sewn together; however the sides are completely open or there is a long side-slit below the armpit. During the mid-Joseon, baeja with short sleeves were worn but were eventually replaced by the sleeveless style in the late 18th century.

Usage 
Baeja was used in winter by both men and women to stay warm; baeja made of thinner fabric were also used in spring and fall by women. In the late Joseon, the baeja was generally considered as a form of overgarment.

In the Pyongyang region, a fur lined baeja called teoldeunggeori or teolbaeja, widely worn by women in winter after the 1945's liberation from Japan; and it continues to be worn in present day.

Similar-looking items 

 Banbi
 Bijia

See also 

 Hanbok
 Jeogori

References

External links 

Korean clothing